The Office of Global Criminal Justice (J/GCJ), formerly called the Office of War Crimes Issues (S/WCI), is an office within the United States Department of State.

Duties
The Office is headed by an Ambassador: in that position, she advises the Secretary of State and the Under Secretary of State for Civilian Security, Human Rights, and Democracy and works to formulate U.S. policy on prevention and accountability for mass atrocities.

The Office coordinates U.S. government support for ad hoc and international courts currently trying persons accused of genocide, war crimes, and crimes against humanity committed (among other places) in the former Yugoslavia, Rwanda, Sierra Leone, and Cambodia, and helps bolster the capacity of domestic judicial systems to try atrocity crimes.  It also works closely with other governments, international institutions, and non-governmental organizations to establish and assist international and domestic commissions, courts, and tribunals to investigate, judge, and deter atrocity crimes in every region of the globe.  The Ambassador coordinates the deployment of a range of diplomatic, legal, economic, military, and intelligence tools to help expose the truth, judge those responsible, protect and assist victims, enable reconciliation, and build the rule of law.

Last developments
Previous Ambassadors in the Office of Global Criminal Justice included Todd F. Buchwald and Morse H. Tan.

According to reports in Foreign Policy, Secretary of State Rex Tillerson had intended to close the Office and fold its personnel into the Bureau of Democracy, Human Rights, and Labor. In an August 28, 2017 letter to Senator Bob Corker, Secretary Tillerson informed the Chairman of the United States Senate Committee on Foreign Relations that he intended to end or transfer as many as three dozen special envoy positions. The letter provided, however, that the office of the Ambassador-at-Large for Global Criminal Justice—along with the Bureau of Counterterrorism and Countering Violent Extremism and the office of the United States Ambassador-at-Large to Monitor and Combat Trafficking in Persons -- "will be retained and continue to be organized under the office of Under Secretary of State for Civilian Security, Democracy, and Human Rights."

References

External links 
 

United States Department of State agencies
War crime prevention